Scelimena hafizaii is an insect found in Malaysia, belonging to the Tetrigidae family.

See also
Phaesticus azemii
Discotettix adenanii
Discotettix selangori
Scelimena razalii
Gavialidium phangensum

References

Insects of Malaysia
Insects described in 2007
Caelifera